Slamet A. Sjukur (30 June 1935 – 24 March 2015) was the founding father of contemporary Indonesian music. He studied and worked in Paris under Olivier Messiaen and Henri Dutilleux. He was a lecturer at IKJ (Institut Kesenian Jakarta) but because of his unconventional ideas, he finally had to leave. He had been living in Jakarta and Surabaya as a freelance composer, teacher and music critic. Developing the idea of minimax in music, his compositions are "notable for their minimal constellation of sounds and for their numerological basis which indicate the composer’s interest in a new ‘ecology of music’".
This idea views limitation not as obstructions but as a challenge to work with a simple material, maximally.

His honors include the Bronze Medal from the Festival de Jeux d’Automne in Dijon (1974), the Golden Record from the Académie Charles Cros in France (1975, for Angklung) and the Zoltán Kodály Commemorative Medal in Hungary (1983). More recently, Gatra named him a Pioneer of Alternative Music (1996) and he was made an Officier de l’Ordre des Arts et des Lettres (2000) and a life member of the Akademi Jakarta (2002). Some of his prominent students include Gilang Ramadhan and Soe Tjen Marching.

Complete list of works
STAGE: Sangkuriang (miniature opera, libretto by Utuy T. Sontani), mixed chorus, 1958; Latigrak (ballet music, choreography by Frédéric Franchini), gamelan orchestra, tape, 1963; Parentheses VI, low-voiced comedian, 2 dancers, flute, 2 guitars, whistling tupies, some gamelan instruments, 1983; Migrasi (music theatre work, text by Afrizal Malna), 1993; Spiral, female dancer, flute, piano, 1993; Awang-Uwung (dance music, choreography by Suprapto Suryodarmo - see Amerta Movement), 2 genders (gamelan instruments), 1994; Marsinah (incidental music, play by Ratna Sarumpaet), ensemble (specially made instruments), 1994

GAMELAN: GAME-Land for full sundanese gamelan orchestra slendro-pelog and female voice (2004/orchestra); GAME-Land 2 for javanese gamelan orchestra slendro (2005/orchestra).

ORCHESTRAL: Õm, 14 strings, 1995; Concerto, arpegina (5-string viola), string orchestra, 2002

CHAMBER MUSIC: Bulan Hijau, clarinet, piano, 1960; Point contre (players also speak), trumpet, harp, percussion, 1969; Ronda Malam, angklung ensemble, 1975 (section of Angklung; may be performed separately); Kangen, 3 shakuhachi, kokyu, Japanese percussion, 1986; Suwung, flute, 1988; Ji-Lala-Ji, 2 players (flutes, percussion), 1989; Cucuku-Cu, guitar, 1990 (also version for 5 pianos 20 hands); Lesung, synthesizer, 1992; Uwek-Uwek, 2 mouth explorers, 1-2 djembés, 1992; Minimax, variable spatial ensemble, 1993; Jawara, percussion, 1993; ‘The Source, Where the Sound Returns’, clarinet, cello, piano, 1999; Dedicace-1, arpegina/viola, 2000; PAHA for brass quintet (2006/chamber music); KUTANG for cl, bsn, tpt, tbn, percussions, violin and db (2007/chamber music)

CHORAL: Angklung, mixed chorus (+ angklungs), angklung ensemble, 1975 (one section, Ronda Malam, angklung ensemble, may be performed separately); Muni, mixed chorus (+ karunding [bamboo jaw harps]), 1998

VOCAL: Bunga, Weekend and Kabut (texts by Sitor Situmorang, Toto Sidarto Bachtiar), voice, piano, 1960; Mais, ces oiseaux, mezzo-soprano, baritone, clarinet, violin, viola, cello, 1967; Parentheses V (text by Chairil Anwar), mezzo-soprano, 4 celli, 1981; Gelandangan, female voice, karunding, 1999 (version of work for karunding, tape); Sunyi, soprano, 2 cellular phones, small orchestra, 2002

PIANO: Tobor, 1961; Svara, 1979; NZ, prepared piano, 1992; Cucuku-Cu, 5 pianos 20 hands, 1992 (version of guitar work); Yu-Taha, 1997

ELECTROACOUSTIC: Astral, tape, 1984; Gelandangan, karunding, tape, 1998 (also version for female voice, karunding, 1999)

MULTIMEDIA: Parentheses I-II (dance music, choreography by Denis Carrey), female dancer, suspended chair, piano, lights, 1972; Parentheses IV, 2 dancers, flute, 2 electric guitars, violin, cello, prepared piano, synthesizer, percussion, live painting, 1973; Parentheses III (dancers also speak, text by Ronald D. Laing, choreography by Samuelina Tahija), coloratura soprano, male speaker, 2 dancers, choreographed conductor, flute, oboe, clarinet, bassoon, string quartet, large sculpture (by Elizabeth Gleason), 1975; Jakarta 450 Tahun (environmental work), unlimited sounds of Jakarta, 1977; Wangi, female dancer, gamelan orchestra, lights, 1999

FILM SCORE (DIRECTOR): Aku Perempuan Dan Laki-Laki Itu, 1996 (Aria Kusumadewa, Afrizal Malna)

He was working on GAME-Land 3 for brass sextet, and MIRA konserto for piano, saluang and orchestra.

References

External links
This issue of Balungan published by the American Gamelan Institute, includes Syukur's piece Tetabuhan Sungut for a cappella voices, using motifs from different styles of gamelan.

2015 deaths
Indonesian composers
People from Surabaya
1935 births
20th-century classical composers
20th-century male musicians
21st-century classical composers
21st-century male musicians
Male classical composers